Theodore Burnett III (born March 22, 1968, Brooklyn, New York), who performs under the name Ras Moshe, is a composer and multi-instrumentalist specializing in saxophone and flute. He is currently based in Brooklyn.

Moshe comes from a musical family. His paternal grandfather, Theodore Burnett (known professionally as "Ted Barnett”) played tenor and alto saxophone with bands led by Lucky Millinder, Earl Bostic, Don Redman, Louis Armstrong, and others. Moshe's father, Theodore Burnett II, also played saxophone.

"The name Ras came when I was around the Rastafarian community and playing in some reggae bands," he said in a 2014 interview. "Moshe is a name given to me when I was a little younger based on a religious conversion in the family."

Career

After high school graduation, Burnett performed with African drummers and a Rastafarian band called the Drums of Freedom Troupe. He became a full-time musician in 1987.

Moshe has recorded and performed with William Hooker, Karl Berger, Stefan Christoff, Blaise Siwula, William Parker, Bill Cole's Un-tempered Ensemble, Marc Edwards, Rashid Bakr, Lisette Santiago, and other contemporary jazz artists. He has led or been a member of Izititiz, the Jesse Dulman Quartet, the Matt Lavelle Quartet, the Heritage Symphony Orchestra, the Ras Moshe Music Now Unit, the Ras Moshe Quartet, the William Parker Orchestra, and other ensembles.

He has recorded for the Ayler, Utech, Straw2gold Pictures, KMB, and 577 labels.

In 2005 and 2006, he released four albums on the Utech label, entitled Live Spirits, Vols. 1, 2, 3 and 4. (Volumes 1 and 2 were released under the name the Ras Moshe Music Now Unit.) The album Transcendence, by the Ras Moshe Quartet, was issued on the KMB Jazz label in 2007. In 2013, under his own name, he released the album Outsight, culled from three live New York City performances, on the Straw2Gold label.

In 2000, Moshe founded the Music Now series at The Brecht Forum in Brooklyn.

Discography

With Dafna Naphtali
Fusebox (Gold Bolus Recordings, 2021)
With Stefan Christoff
Rêves Sonores À Alwan (Howl!, 2016)
as Ras Moshe
Outsight (Straw2Gold, 2013)
With Dave Ross, Federico Ughi
RED RIVER FLOWS (577 Records, 2008)
as Ras Moshe Music Now Unit
Live Spirits vol 1-4 (Utech Records, 2005–06)

References

American avant-garde musicians
Musicians from Brooklyn
American jazz saxophonists
American male saxophonists
American jazz flautists
American jazz composers
American jazz bandleaders
1968 births
Living people
Jazz musicians from New York (state)
21st-century American saxophonists
American male jazz composers
21st-century American male musicians
21st-century flautists